Charles William Beauclerk (7 May 1816 – 23 May 1863) was an English first-class cricketer active 1835–37 who played for Oxford University and Marylebone Cricket Club (MCC). The son of Lord Frederick Beauclerk, he was born in Kimpton, Hertfordshire and died in Boulogne-sur-Mer. He appeared in twelve first-class matches.

Notes

1816 births
1863 deaths
Oxford University cricketers
English cricketers
Gentlemen cricketers
Marylebone Cricket Club cricketers
Non-international England cricketers
People educated at Charterhouse School
Alumni of Christ Church, Oxford